The 2013 South American Rugby Championship (Confederación Sudamericana de Rugby (CONSUR) Championship) Division A will double as a 2015 Rugby World Cup qualifier. The matches will be held in Montevideo, Uruguay and Temuco, Chile between 27 April and 4 May 2013.

Argentina already qualified for the 2015 Rugby World Cup, after being quarter-finalists at the 2011 Rugby World Cup. The highest place team after Argentina will progress to a playoff with the losing team in the North America playoff, either Canada or the US.

Argentina, Uruguay and Chile have qualified for this tournament, after finishing in the top three of the 2012 edition.  The fourth spot went to Brazil, decided by a playoff between the 4th placed team at the 2012 South American Rugby Championship "A" (Brazil) and the 2012 South American Rugby Championship "B" champions (Paraguay).

Standings

Pre-tournament rankings are in parentheses.

Matches

Round 1

Round 2

Round 3

See also 
 2013 South American Rugby Championship "B"
 2013 South American Rugby Championship "C"

External links 
 Details

References 

2013
2013 rugby union tournaments for national teams
A
2013 in Argentine rugby union
rugby union
rugby union
rugby union
South American Rugby Championship "A"
South American Rugby Championship "A"
International rugby union competitions hosted by Uruguay
International rugby union competitions hosted by Chile